The Kingdom of Argha was a petty kingdom in the confederation of 24 states known as Chaubisi Rajya. It was part of the Kingdom of Palpa but it broke off to become an independent kingdom. Later Argha, and the Kingdom of Khanchi merged becoming Arghakhanchi. Argha was annexed into the Kingdom of Nepal during the Unification of Nepal by commanders Amar Singh Thapa and Damodar Pande.

References 

Former countries in South Asia
Argha
History of Nepal
Chaubisi Rajya
A